Amirabad (also Romanized as Āmīrābād) is a village in Afin Rural District, Zohan District, Zirkuh County, South Khorasan Province, Iran. At the 2006 census, its population was 31, in 7 families.

References 

Populated places in Zirkuh County